Tell City Jr.-Sr. High School is a public school in Tell City, Indiana.

Athletics
The Tell City Marksmen are members of the Pocket Athletic Conference.  The school colors are red and white.  The following IHSAA sanctioned sports are offered:

Baseball (boys)
Basketball (girls and boys)
Cross country (girls and boys)
Football (boys)
Golf (girls and boys)
Soccer (girls and boys)
Softball (girls)
Swimming (girls and boys)
Tennis (girls and boys)
Track (girls and boys)
Volleyball (girls)
Wrestling (boys)

Arts
Tell City has a marching band and a chorus that participate in interscholastic competition.

Notable alumni 
Wally Bruner - journalist, radio station owner - Class of 1949
Paul D. Etienne - Archbishop of Seattle - Class of 1977
Bob Polk - college basketball coach
Burke Scott - college basketball player and high school basketball coach
Tommy Kron - NBA basketball player
Phil Jones - Major League Gaming coach, X Games medalist

See also
 List of high schools in Indiana

References

External links

High schools in Southwestern Indiana
Pocket Athletic Conference
Big Eight Conference (IHSAA)
Former Southern Indiana Athletic Conference members
Schools in Perry County, Indiana
Public high schools in Indiana
1922 establishments in Indiana